The following is the discography of the American metal band Lamb of God. Originally known under the moniker "Burn the Priest", the band was founded in 1994 by Chris Adler, John Campbell and Mark Morton. In 1999, Burn the Priest released their self-titled full-length debut, released through Legion Records, shortly after the release, the band changed its name to "Lamb of God" and signed a record deal with Prosthetic Records. The group's next album, New American Gospel, was released in 2000. Produced by Devin Townsend, 2003's As the Palaces Burn was critically acclaimed, with Revolver magazine awarding it "Album of the Year".

In 2004, Ashes of the Wake was released through the band's major label debut—through Epic Records—Ashes of the Wake, that sold 35,000 copies in its first week of release and peak at #27 on the Billboard 200. Lamb of God's second video album, titled Killadelphia in reference to the location where it was filmed, at Trocadero Theatre in Philadelphia during October 2004, was released in June 2005—sold 8,000 in its first-week and peak at #4 on the Billboard Top Music Videos chart—being certified gold by the Recording Industry Association of America (RIAA) in August the same year, for sales in excess of 50,000 copies. At the end of the same year was released the audio edition. Their second full-length issued by Epic label, 2006's Sacrament, in its first week of release sold around 63,000 copies in the United States and peak at #8 on the Billboard 200 chart. In July 2008, Lamb of God release the follow-up to Killadelphia entitled Walk with Me in Hell, the two-disc DVD peak at #2 on the Billboard Top Music Videos chart (their best-career position to date), selling over 13,000 copies in its first week of release in the US. Walk with Me in Hell was certified gold by RIAA in August the same year. Lamb of God's fifth studio album Wrath, was released through Epic in the US, and Roadrunner Records worldwide, on February 24, 2009. It debuted at #2 on the US Billboard 200 chart, selling nearly 68,000 copies. Lamb of God released two more albums—Resolution (2012) and VII: Sturm und Drang (2015)—before parting ways with original drummer Chris Adler in 2019, who was replaced by Art Cruz. The band's self-titled eighth studio album was released on June 19, 2020, making it their first full-length in five years and first release with Cruz.

Albums

Studio albums

Burn the Priest albums

Live albums

Compilation albums

EPs

Singles 

 "New Colossal Hate"
 "Routes"
 "Ghost Shaped People"

Videos

Video albums

Music videos

References

External links 
 Official website

Heavy metal group discographies
Discography
Discographies of American artists